is a former professional basketball assistant coach for Tokio, Akita, and Osaka in Japan.

References

External links

1981 births
Living people
Akita Northern Happinets coaches
Japanese basketball coaches
Osaka Evessa coaches
Sportspeople from Yamaguchi Prefecture
Tokio Marine Nichido Big Blue coaches
Tokyo Cinq Rêves coaches
Tryhoop Okayama coaches
Waseda University alumni